Arthur Basil Briscoe (1903 – 1951) was a British racehorse trainer. The son of William Arthur Briscoe, of Longstowe Hall, Cambridgeshire, and May Matilda Boughey, he was educated at Eton College. He ran a mixed stable from the family seat at Longstowe and then Newmarket and was the joint master of the Cambridgeshire Harriers in 1929, based at Bottisham.

Golden Miller
Briscoe discovered Golden Miller as an unbroken three-year-old in Ireland and encouraged Dorothy Paget to buy him. The horse won four consecutive Cheltenham Gold Cups (1932-1935) for Briscoe (and a fifth in 1936) and the 1934 Grand National, but Paget and Briscoe fell out after the 1935 Grand National when Golden Miller, the pre-race favourite, tried to refuse a fence and unseated his jockey.

References

People educated at Eton College
1903 births
1951 deaths
People from South Cambridgeshire District